Back from the Dead is the second mixtape by American hip hop recording artist Chief Keef. The mixtape was produced by Young Chop and hosted by DJ Victoriouz and DJ Moondawg. It was released on March 12, 2012. A remastered version hosted by DJ Hustlenomics was released on March 14, 2012 on iTunes. The mixtape features guest appearances from Lil Reese, Soulja Boy, King Louie, SD, Johnny May Cash and Yale Lucciani.

"I Don't Like" featuring Lil Reese was first included on the mixtape, and was released as a single. It peaked at number 73 on the Billboard Hot 100, and is included on his debut album Finally Rich. The official remix to "I Don't Like" features Kanye West, Pusha T, Big Sean and Jadakiss and is included on the GOOD Music collaboration album Cruel Summer. As of October 31, 2014, the mixtape has been downloaded over 683,000 times on DatPiff and certified double platinum.

In February 2014, Keef confirmed via Twitter that the sequel mixtape titled Back from the Dead 2 was in the works with a release date set for sometime in 2014. The mixtape's cover resembles that of the film Dawn of the Dead. The sequel was released on October 31, 2014 and was completely produced by Chief Keef, other than 4 tracks produced by Young Chop, Purps On Da Beat and Ace Bankz. It also has only 2 features with Gucci Mane and Tadoe of Chief Keef's own label Glo Gang.

Reception

Critical response
Jordan Sargent at Pitchfork Media said in a review, "Back From the Dead, his breakthrough mixtape is loud, rough, unrelenting, lurching, and undeniably the child of Waka Flocka Flame and producer Lex Luger's indelible Flockaveli. But if you read the title more literally to mean that Keef is something like a zombie, it's maybe even more appropriate. Surrounded by beats from producer Young Chop that are stuffed with the sound of gunshots and Keef's choice ad-lib, "Bang Bang," he's close to stoic throughout, stalking expressionless through the streets."

Accolades
The mixtape was named the 11th best mixtape of 2012 by DatPiff. DatPiff also poistioned Lil Reese's certified gold mixtape "Don't Like" hosted by DJ Drama and Don Cannon at 44th on their "50 Best Mixtapes of 2012" list. Both mixtapes were produced by Chicago producer Young Chop and included the hit single, "I Don't Like".

Other responses
In October and December 2013 Lady Gaga upload a few videos on her Instagram account, in which she is listening to Keef's song "3Hunna" from the mixtape. Later, in an AMA interview she said, "I’ve been listening to a lot of Chief Keef, so I’m kinda into Chicago music right now, I was living there for a while, so we’ve been listening to a lot of his records. I’m a big fan." Keef returned the praise via Twitter shortly thereafter, stating, "I love Lady Gaga For Sayin She Listens to a lot of me and What’s so crazy I was jus Watchin Dis redcarpet shit Like damn dis Girl fine," adding, "Love You Lady Gaga."

Track listing
All tracks produced by Young Chop.

References

2012 mixtape albums
Chief Keef albums
Albums produced by Young Chop